Princess Margaret Secondary is a public high school in Surrey, British Columbia and is part of School District 36 Surrey. The school is notable in Surrey for its sports programs. The goals of Princess Margaret Secondary include increasing reading comprehension and increasing numeracy skills in Grade 8 students. The Princess Margaret Secondary school is located only 2 street blocks east of the Surrey Campus of Kwantlen Polytechnic University. The current building was completed in 1999; a previous smaller brick and mortar building served secondary students at the same site from 1961 until the summer of 1998 when it was demolished.

Gallery

History

Bose Road School 
Princess Margaret High School was built in 1949/50 at 13220 64th Avenue. It shared the site with Bose Road Elementary School. At its founding, only grade 11s and 12s attended. Construction finished late in the 1950 school year, so students attended shifts at Queen Elizabeth Secondary. At its inception, the school was built to accommodate 500 students with 14 classrooms, a gym, an industrial arts shop and cafeteria facilities. The gym was unique among Surrey's schools for being completely detached from the rest of the building. In September 1961, PMHS moved to 72nd avenue and the 64th avenue school building became Newton Junior School

Senior High School (1961-94) 
The new Princess Margaret High School was located at 12870 72nd Avenue. Students from North Delta attended due to the nearest Delta school being in Ladner. In 1967-68 when QE burnt down, Princess Margaret accommodated half of the school. QE students were in session in the morning, and PM students in the afternoon. Various upgrades over the years allowed the school to enroll a larger number of students.

1967 fire 
In November 1967, the school had a fire of its own. Fires broke out in the administrative offices and were burning for a long period of time before being discovered. The columns and floors were made out of concrete, which stemmed the spread of the flames, and little long-lasting damage was done. Students lost four days of school due to the fire.

Secondary School (1994-Present) 
In the early 90s, Princess Margaret began to enroll some grade 8s-10s from Newton Junior while a new secondary school was being built. By 1994, it was a full secondary school. Concerns were raised about the cost of the school structure and seismic warnings, and the old school was torn down in 1999 and replaced by a new school building

Student volunteer work
Princess Margaret students volunteered again in 2011 with the installation of Christmas lights at St. Paul's Hospital for the 'Lights of Hope' campaign in Vancouver.  The student volunteers are enrolled in the BCIT Electrical Program while in secondary school.

Notable alumni
Jazzy B (Jaswinder Singh Bains), Punjabi Singer
Lisa Brokop, country singer and actress
Chani Nattan, Punjabi Singer and songwriter

See also
Monarchy in British Columbia

References

High schools in Surrey, British Columbia
Educational institutions established in 1950
1950 establishments in British Columbia
Educational institutions established in 1961
1961 establishments in British Columbia